Vif may refer to:

Vif (proper name) 

 VIF Internet, an Internet service provider in Montreal
 Vif, Isère, a commune of the Isère département in France

Vif (word) 
 Vif, a French tempo marking meaning "lively" or "fast"

VIF (abbreviation) 
 Vivekananda International Foundation, New Delhi based think-tank
Valency interaction formula, a method for drawing molecular structural formulas
 Variance inflation factor, a measure of collinearity in statistical regression models
 Very Important Friend, an affectionate term
 Visual information fidelity, measure for image quality assessment
 Visiting International Faculty Program, a company, based in North Carolina, United States, that sponsors international teachers to teach in the US
 Value of in-force, a life insurance term
 "Virtual Interface", a networking term 
 Viral infectivity factor of retroviruses, specifically used in the context of HIV
 "Vector Unit InterFace" on PlayStation 2
 "Verify in field", a construction documentation term
 Vignerons indépendants de France, an organisation that assists independent winemakers in France.
 Vålerenga Fotball, a Norwegian football club
 Vålerenga Ishockey, a Norwegian ice hockey club
 Vålerengens Idrettsforening, a Norwegian sports club